James Glickenhaus (born July 24, 1950) is an American film producer, financier, director and automotive entrepreneur.

He is currently general partner of Glickenhaus & Co., a family partnership originally started by his father Seth Glickenhaus.

Glickenhaus wrote, directed and produced a number of films in the 1980s and 1990s, including The Exterminator and the Jackie Chan vehicle The Protector. In an interview from 2012, about his movie career, he explained his reasons for retiring from the movie business: "What happened at the end was that the studios had taken over everything. And it was very difficult as an independent to compete with them. They could spend so much money that the stars you had access to as an independent were asking a mega amount money. They knew you had no choice. It became harder and harder and harder."

Glickenhaus's involvement in the world of automobiles

Cars that Glickenhaus owns 

Glickenhaus is an avid collector of former racing vehicles, especially Ferraris. The cars that Glickenhaus owns in his garage include:

 2010 SCG P 4/5 Competizione
2006 Ferrari P 4/5 by Pininfarina
 1988 Ferrari GTB Turbo
 1981 Circa Piper P4 DP003
 1970 Ferrari Modulo by Pininfarina
 1967 Dino Berlinetta Competizione
 1967 Baja Boot
 1967 Ford Mk IV J6
 1967 Ferrari 412 P 0854
 1966 Lola T-70 Sl 71-32
 1957 Chevrolet Belair Convertible
 1947 Ferrari 159 Spyder Corsa
 1932 Stutz DV-32
 1931 Duesenberg J446

His coachbuilt 2006 Ferrari P 4/5 by Pininfarina, listed above, has been extensively covered by national publications like Car and Driver.

Scuderia Cameron Glickenhaus 
Glickenhaus is the owner and managing member of Scuderia Cameron Glickenhaus, the automobile company that Glickenhaus started. Scuderia Cameron Glickenhaus currently makes 5 types of cars, the SCG 003, SCG 004, SCG Boot, SCG 006, and the SCG 007. The race-oriented 003 takes design cues from Formula One racecars, designed to race with the 24 Hours of Nürburgring in mind. The 004 is another, toned-down supercar, more fit for driving on the street. The Boot is built for racing at the Baja 1000. The 006 is the car that takes design cues from the cars of the early to mid-20th century. The 007 is Glickenhaus's entry for Le Mans Hypercar.

Movie career 
Glickenhaus called his first feature film, The Astrologer, "a learning experience". For his next movie, the vigilante movie The Exterminator, he decided to concentrate more on action and less on dialogue. The movie became a commercial success and Glickenhaus was asked by Avco-Embassy to deliver a more mainstream action film as his next project. This became the spy-thriller The Soldier, starring Ken Wahl and Klaus Kinski. In a 2012 interview, Glickenhaus explained that his movie career could have turned out very differently, had he decided to move to Hollywood after the success of The Exterminator:"I was contacted a lot by studios. But I think I was afraid of the control of the studios. I had the ability to make films independently. I enjoyed doing it that way. Another part of it was I loved New York. I loved living in New York. I had a lot of friends there. And I knew if I really wanted to be a Hollywood director I would have had to move to LA and spend a lot of time socializing to make contacts. You know, for want of a better word, networking. And I wasn’t interested in doing that."Glickenhaus made The Protector for Golden Harvest, one of several attempts by Jackie Chan to break out in the American market, on the condition that Glickenhaus "had total creative control and final cut of the movie". The version that was released internationally is the Glickenhaus version. Jackie Chan edited a different version for the Hong Kong and Japanese market.

Filmography

 The Astrologer (1975) (director)
The Exterminator (1980) (director, writer)
The Soldier (1982) (director, writer, producer)
The Protector (1985) (director, writer)
Maniac Cop (1988) (executive producer)
 Shakedown (1988) (director, writer)
 Basket Case 2 (1990) (executive producer)
 Frankenhooker (1990) (producer)
 McBain (1991) (director, writer)
 Basket Case 3: The Progeny (1992) (executive producer)
 Slaughter of the Innocents (1993) (director, writer)
 Ring of Steel (1994) (executive producer)
 Tough and Deadly (1995) (executive producer)
Timemaster (1995) (director, writer)
Bad Biology (2008) (actor)
The Art Thief (2015) (actor)

References

External links
 
Scuderia Cameron Glickenhaus
SCG 003 
SCG 004 
SCG Boot 
SCG 006  
SCG 007 
Glickenhaus's collection of cars 

1950 births
Film producers from New York (state)
American car collectors
Living people
Businesspeople from New York City
Film directors from New York City
American founders of automobile manufacturers